Sebastián Elías Gómez, (born September 13, 1986 in Buenos Aires) is an Argentine football goalkeeper.
He currently plays for Berazategui.

References

External links

1986 births
Living people
Footballers from Buenos Aires
Association football goalkeepers
Argentine footballers
Club Atlético Huracán footballers
CSyD Tristán Suárez footballers
Barracas Central players
Talleres de Remedios de Escalada footballers
Primera Nacional players
Primera B Metropolitana players